On May 14, 2020, Mattieo Condoluci, a convicted sex offender, was shot dead by James Fairbanks in Omaha, Nebraska, United States. Fairbanks had arrived at his house, and shot Condoluci 7 times. After the killing, public opinion was divided. Some people claimed that Condoluci's murder was not justified, and other people expressed their support for Fairbanks.

Background

Mattieo Condoluci 
Mattieo Condoluci was a former nightclub bouncer who was convicted of two counts of child molestation, first in 1994 in Florida and in 2007 in Sarpy County. In the 1994 case, he had sexually assaulted a five-year-old boy and served five years in prison, and in 2007, he raped a 13-year-old girl and served 2 years in prison.

James Fairbanks 
James Fairbanks was a school teacher who had been divorced and was a father of two.

Murder 
On May 14, 2020, Condoluci answered the door, and Fairbanks immediately shot him dead. One bullet pierced his forehead, and other bullets shot his back and chest. Overall, Condoluci was shot 7 times. After the killing, Fairbanks anonymously sent a letter to the KMTV news station, confessing to the crime.

Legal proceedings 
Fairbanks pleaded no contest to second degree murder. On July 14, 2021, he was sentenced to 40-70 years in prison.

Aftermath

Reactions within family 
Condoluci's daughter, Amanda Henry, defended Fairbanks and was thankful when she heard that Condoluci had been killed. Henry claimed she was constantly abused by Condoluci, and claimed that he had molested her. However, his son, Joseph Condoluci, was deeply upset about the killing.

Other reactions 
Laura Smith also campaigned to free Fairbanks. Smith's son was raped by Condoluci in 1994, and died of a drug overdose several years later.

See also 
 Stephen Marshall

References 

2020 controversies in the United States
2020 in Nebraska
2020 murders in the United States
Deaths by firearm in Nebraska
May 2020 crimes in the United States
Vigilantism against sex offenders